The Nation's Business is a Canadian free-time political television series which began on CBC Television in 1956. The show, which was established with the consultation of the Canadian political parties, initially was 10 minutes long but was increased to 15 by the end of the year.

Premise
The series began in early 1956 as a ten-minute time slot in which federal political parties could address television viewers. Initially, it aired on opposite weeks to The Rhythm Pals. The schedule was established in consultation with the elected political parties, based on the practice of a similar existing free-time CBC Radio series.

In late 1956, episodes were increased to a 15-minute length and alternated with a regional free time political broadcast (Provincial Affairs) which provided similar access programming for the provincial parties. During its initial years, French broadcasts (Les affaires de l'etat) were presented in rotation with English while the expansion of separate English and French CBC networks continued. Eventually the program was reduced to a 5-7-minute time slot.

Producers

 Michael Hind-Smith (1956–60)
 Lewis Miller (1960–64)
 Jim Taylor (1964–66)
 Bernard Ostry (1966–68)
 Gordon Cullingham (1969–71)
 Brian O'Connor (1971–73)
 Del McKenzie (1976–77)
 Nancy McLarty (1979–80)
 Brian Frappier (1980-?)

Scheduling

Early episodes in late 1956 were broadcast certain Mondays at 7:30 p.m. Through the 1950s and 1960s, the series appeared in early evening timeslots, moving to late Sunday nights from October 1969.

References

External links
 

CBC Television original programming
1956 Canadian television series debuts
Black-and-white Canadian television shows